Kyeong-Hee Choi is an associate professor of modern Korean literature at the University of Chicago.  

Her recent research and teaching interests have been focused around the relationships between historical and literary representation and the experience of modern Koreans, including colonial rule, national division, the Korean War, the Cold War, and democratization. During her work in these directions, she has also pursued issues and questions surrounding gender, focusing on writings of women of color and feminist criticism.

References

University of Chicago faculty
Living people
Year of birth missing (living people)